Fufeng County is a county under the administration of the prefecture-level city of Baoji, in the west-central part of Shaanxi Province, China. The county lies in the fertile Guanzhong Plain on the north bank of the Wei River between Xi'an,  to the east, and Baoji,  to the west.

The township of Famen contains the Famen Temple and Zhouyuan Museum (in Zhaochen Village). The Zhouyuan Museum covers archeological excavations of bronzeware from the Zhou dynasty which were discovered nearby. A Zhou dynasty capital was located here during the late 11th century. Nowadays Fufeng is mostly reliant on agriculture.

Administrative divisions
As 2019, Fufeng county is divided into 1 subdistrict and 7 towns.

Subdistricts
Chengguan,

Towns
Tiandu, Wujing, Jiangzhang, Duanjia, Xinglin, Shaogong, Famen

Climate

Culture 
Fufeng is known for its vinegar made from grains, which is produced by local rural households. It is also known for a dish combining Douhua and Paomo.

References

County-level divisions of Shaanxi
Baoji